Jolo is a volcanic island in the Philippines.

Jolo may also refer to:
 Jolo, Sulu, a municipality in Jolo Island
 Jolo Group of Volcanoes, in Jolo Island
 Jolo, West Virginia, an unincorporated community 
 Jolo (writer) (Jan Olof Olsson, 1920—1974), Swedish writer and journalist
 Jolo Revilla, actor and politician
 "#JOLO", an episode of Family Guy

See also 
 Yolo (disambiguation)